Dumar, also known as Do Ghar, may refer to:
 Dumar-e Olya
 Dumar-e Meyani
 Dumar-e Sofla